In probability theory, more specifically the study of random matrices, the circular law concerns the distribution of eigenvalues of an  random matrix with independent and identically distributed entries in the limit
.

Precise statement
Let  be a sequence of  matrix ensembles whose entries are i.i.d. copies of a complex random variable  with mean 0 and variance 1.

With these definitions in mind, the circular law asserts that almost surely (i.e. with probability one), the sequence of measures  converges in distribution to the uniform measure on the unit disk.

History

For random matrices with Gaussian distribution of entries (the Ginibre ensembles), the circular law was established in the 1960s by Jean Ginibre. In the 1980s, Vyacheslav Girko introduced  an approach which allowed to establish the circular law for more general distributions. Further progress was made  by Zhidong Bai, who established the circular law under certain smoothness assumptions on the distribution.

The assumptions were further relaxed in the works of Terence Tao and Van H. Vu, Guangming Pan and Wang Zhou, and Friedrich Götze and Alexander Tikhomirov. Finally, in 2010 Tao and Vu proved the circular law under the minimal assumptions stated above.

The circular law result was extended in 1988 by Sommers, Crisanti, Sompolinsky and Stein to an elliptical law for ensembles of matrices with arbitrary correlations. The elliptic and circular laws were further generalized by Aceituno, Rogers and Schomerus to the hypotrochoid law which includes higher order correlations.

See also
Wigner semicircle distribution

References

Random matrices